David B. Sarwer, Ph.D. (born January 4, 1968, in Chicago, Illinois) is a clinical psychologist who currently serves as the Associate Dean for Research, Director of the Center for Obesity Research and Education, and Professor of Social and Behavioral Sciences in the College of Public Health at Temple University.

Educational background 

Sarwer graduated from Forest View High School in Arlington Heights, Illinois in 1986. He received his B.A. in 1990 from Tulane University, graduating Summa Cum Laude, Phi Beta Kappa, and with Honors in Psychology. He subsequently received his M.A. in 1992 and his doctorate in Clinical Psychology in 1995 from Loyola University of Chicago. He then completed his internship year at the Medical College of Pennsylvania at Eastern Pennsylvania Psychiatric Institute in Philadelphia, Pennsylvania.

Career 

Sarwer began his career as a post-doctoral fellow at the Perelman School of Medicine at the University of Pennsylvania from 1995-1997.  From 1997-2004, he served as Assistant Professor of Psychology in the Departments of Psychiatry and Surgery. He was promoted to Associate Professor in 2004 and Professor in 2012.   While at Penn, he served as Director of Clinical Services at the Center for Weight and Eating Disorders, Director of the Stunkard Weight Management Program, as well as Consulting Psychologist to both the Center for Human Appearance and Division of Plastic Surgery at the Children's Hospital of Philadelphia. In 2015, he became Associate Dean for Research, Director of the Center for Obesity Research and Education, and Professor of Social and Behavioral Sciences in the College of Public Health at Temple University.

Much of Sarwer’s work has focused on the psychosocial and behavioral aspects of extreme obesity and Bariatric surgery. His research has been funded by the National Institutes of Health since 2002. He was the founding Editor-in-Chief for the journal Obesity Science and Practice. He also serves as Senior Associate Editor for the journal Health Psychology, Associate Editor for the journal Obesity Surgery, and is on the Editorial Board of the American Psychologist, Childhood Obesity, and Surgery for the Treatment of Obesity and Related Diseases.

Sarwer also maintains a line of research on the psychological aspects of physical appearance and, more specifically, both reconstructive and cosmetic plastic surgery. Much of his early work in this area focused on the relationship between body image, body dysmorphic disorder, and cosmetic surgery.   More recently, his work has focused more on physical disfigurement and reconstructive procedures. This includes several grants from the Department of Defense looking at the use of vascularized composite allotransplantation procedures to treat military veterans who have suffered devastating injures while in service to United States Military. Sarwer currently serves on the Editorial Board of the Aesthetic Surgery Journal and Plastic and Reconstructive Surgery.  s

Recent significant publications

Obesity and bariatric surgery

Original research 
Gasoyan H, Halpern MT, Tajeu G, Sarwer DB. Impact of insurance plan design on bariatric surgery utilization. Surg Obes Relat Dis. 2019 Oct;15(10):1812-1818. doi: 10.1016/j.soard.2019.07.022. Epub 2019 Aug 5. PMID 31515131; PMCID: PMC6834903.
Schmitz KH, Troxel AB, Dean LT, DeMichele A, Brown JC, Sturgeon K, Zhang Z, Evangelisti M, Spinelli B, Kallan MJ, Denlinger C, Cheville A, Winkels RM, Chodosh L, Sarwer DB. Effect of Home-Based Exercise and Weight Loss Programs on Breast Cancer-Related Lymphedema Outcomes Among Overweight Breast Cancer Survivors: The WISER Survivor Randomized Clinical Trial. JAMA Oncol. 2019 Nov 1;5(11):1605-1613. doi: 10.1001/jamaoncol.2019.2109. PMID 31415063; PMCID: PMC6696732.
Kumanyika SK, Morales KH, Allison KC, Russell Localio A, Sarwer DB, Phipps E, Fassbender JE, Tsai AG, Wadden TA. Two-Year Results of Think Health! ¡Vive Saludable!: A Primary Care Weight-Management Trial. Obesity (Silver Spring). 2018 Sep;26(9):1412-1421. doi: 10.1002/oby.22258. Epub 2018 Aug 29. PMID 30160061; PMCID: PMC6143399.
Sarwer, D.B., Wadden, T.A., Spitzer, J.C. et al. 4-Year Changes in Sex Hormones, Sexual Functioning, and Psychosocial Status in Women Who Underwent Bariatric Surgery. OBES SURG 28, 892–899 (2018). https://doi.org/10.1007/s11695-017-3025-7
Sarwer DB, Dilks RJ, Spitzer JC, Berkowitz RI, Wadden TA, Moore RH, Chittams JL, Brandt ML, Chen MK, Courcoulas AP, Harmon CM, Helmrath MA, Michalsky MP, Xanthakos SA, Zeller MH, Jenkins TM, Inge TH. Changes in Dietary Intake and Eating Behavior in Adolescents After Bariatric Surgery: an Ancillary Study to the Teen-LABS Consortium. Obes Surg. 2017 Dec;27(12):3082-3091. doi: 10.1007/s11695-017-2764-9. PMID 28625002; PMCID: PMC5747929.
Zeller MH, Washington GA, Mitchell JE, Sarwer DB, Reiter-Purtill J, Jenkins TM, Courcoulas AP, Peugh JL, Michalsky MP, Inge TH; Teen-LABS Consortium and in collaboration with the TeenView Study Group. Alcohol use risk in adolescents 2 years after bariatric surgery. Surg Obes Relat Dis. 2017 Jan;13(1):85-94. doi: 10.1016/j.soard.2016.05.019. Epub 2016 May 25. PMID 27567561; PMCID: PMC5123970.

Reviews 
 Sarwer DB, Heinberg LJ. A review of the psychosocial aspects of clinically severe obesity and bariatric surgery. The American Psychologist. 2020 Feb-Mar;75(2):252-264. DOI: 10.1037/amp0000550. PMID 32052998; PMCID: PMC7027921.
Sarwer DB, Allison KC, Wadden TA, Ashare R, Spitzer JC, McCuen-Wurst C, LaGrotte C, Williams NN, Edwards M, Tewksbury C, Wu J. Psychopathology, disordered eating, and impulsivity as predictors of outcomes of bariatric surgery. Surg Obes Relat Dis. 2019 Apr;15(4):650-655. doi: 10.1016/j.soard.2019.01.029. Epub 2019 Feb 23. PMID 30858009; PMCID: PMC6538470.
Gasoyan H, Tajeu G, Halpern MT, Sarwer DB. Reasons for underutilization of bariatric surgery: The role of insurance benefit design. Surg Obes Relat Dis. 2019 Jan;15(1):146-151. doi: 10.1016/j.soard.2018.10.005. Epub 2018 Oct 13. PMID 30425002; PMCID: PMC6441615.
Yarborough CM 3rd, Brethauer S, Burton WN, Fabius RJ, Hymel P, Kothari S, Kushner RF, Morton JM, Mueller K, Pronk NP, Roslin MS, Sarwer DB, Svazas B, Harris JS, Ash GI, Stark JT, Dreger M, Ording J. Obesity in the Workplace: Impact, Outcomes, and Recommendations. J Occup Environ Med. 2018 Jan;60(1):97-107. doi: 10.1097/JOM.0000000000001220. PMID 29303847; PMCID: PMC6034693.

Body image and plastic surgery

Original research 
 Hartung, F., Jamrozik, A., Rosen, M.E. et al. Behavioural and Neural Responses to Facial Disfigurement. Sci Rep 9, 8021 (2019). https://doi.org/10.1038/s41598-019-44408-8
Jamrozik, A., Oraa Ali, M., Sarwer, D. B., & Chatterjee, A. (2019). More than skin deep: Judgments of individuals with facial disfigurement. Psychology of Aesthetics, Creativity, and the Arts, 13(1), 117–129. https://doi.org/10.1037/aca0000147

Reviews 
 Sarwer, DB. Body image, cosmetic surgery, and minimally invasive treatments, Body Image, Volume 31, 2019, Pages 302-308, ISSN 1740-1445, https://doi.org/10.1016/j.bodyim.2019.01.009.
Sharp G, Maynard P, Hamori CA, Oates J, Sarwer DB, Kulkarni J. Measuring Quality of Life in Female Genital Cosmetic Procedure Patients: A Systematic Review of Patient-Reported Outcome Measures. Aesthet Surg J. 2020 Feb 17;40(3):311-318. doi: 10.1093/asj/sjz325. PMID 31720690.
Sharp G, Maynard P, Hudaib AR, Hamori CA, Oates J, Kulkarni J, Sarwer DB. Do Genital Cosmetic Procedures Improve Women's Self-Esteem? A Systematic Review and Meta-Analysis. Aesthet Surg J. 2020 Sep 14;40(10):1143-1151. doi: 10.1093/asj/sjaa038. PMID 32020160.
Weissler JM, Chang BL, Carney MJ, Rengifo D, Messa CA 4th, Sarwer DB, Percec I. Gender-Affirming Surgery in Persons with Gender Dysphoria. Plast Reconstr Surg. 2018 Mar;141(3):388e-396e. doi: 10.1097/PRS.0000000000004123. PMID 29481407.

Books

Press

Obesity and bariatric surgery 
Weir, Kristen (July 1, 2021). "The Extra Weight of COVID-19" Monitor on Psychology. Retrieved July 27, 2021.
Kale, Sirin (June 17, 2019). "Bariatric Divorce: Why Extreme Weight Loss Leads to Break Ups." https://www.theguardian.com/lifeandstyle/2019/jun/17/bariatric-divorce-why-extreme-weight-loss-leads-to-break-ups Retrieved July 27, 2021.
Tung, Liz (June 21, 2018). "Do Soda Taxes Help or Hurt the Poor." https://whyy.org/segments/do-soda-taxes-help-or-hurt-the-poor/ Retrieved July 27, 2021. 
Morris, Megan (May 9, 2018). "Weight Loss and Relationships: Not Always a Match Made in Heaven." https://www.metro.us/weight-loss-and-relationships-not-always-a-match-made-in-heaven/ Retrieved July 27, 2021.
Healy, Melissa (March 28, 2018). "After Weight-Loss Surgery, Singles Were More Likely to Start a Relationship and Couples were More Likely to Split." https://www.latimes.com/science/sciencenow/la-sci-sn-bariatric-surgery-relationship-status-20180327-story.html Retrieved July 27, 2021.

Body image and plastic surgery 
(May 26, 2021). "The Mesmerizing Pull of Plastic Surgery Videos." https://www.nytimes.com/2021/05/26/style/plastic-surgery-videos.html?referringSource=articleShare The New York Times. Retrieved July 27, 2021. 
(February 15, 2021). "Wearing a Facemask Makes you More Attractive." https://www.dw.com/en/wearing-a-facemask-makes-you-more-attractive/av-56576864 DW.com. Retrieved July 27, 2021. 
(February 11, 2021). "Masks Mess with Our Brain's Ability to Recognize Faces, but Research Suggests there is a Silver Lining." https://www.cbc.ca/news/canada/covid-masks-face-recognition-perception-1.5901300 CBC.ca. Retrieved July 27, 2021.
(August 20, 2020). "Beauty and the Mask." https://philadelphia.cbslocal.com/2020/08/20/beauty-and-the-mask-study-attractiveness-temple-university-university-pennsylvania/ Philadelphia.cbslocal.com. Retrieved July 27, 2021.

References 

1968 births
Living people
Clinical psychologists
Tulane University alumni
Loyola University Chicago alumni
University of Pennsylvania faculty
Perelman School of Medicine at the University of Pennsylvania faculty
American clinical psychologists